Senator Kirkpatrick may refer to:

George G. Kirkpatrick Jr. (1938–2003), Florida State Senate
Kay Kirkpatrick (fl. 2010s–2020s), Georgia State Senate
Snyder S. Kirkpatrick (1848–1909), Kansas State Senate
Thomas J. Kirkpatrick (1829–1897), Virginia State Senate